Sulphur is an extinct town in Meade County, in the U.S. state of South Dakota.

History
A post office called Sulphur was established in 1906, and remained in operation until 1958. The town took its name from Sulphur Creek.

References

Ghost towns in South Dakota
Geography of Meade County, South Dakota